Patrick Joseph Caulfield,  (29 January 1936 – 29 September 2005), was an English painter and printmaker known for his bold canvases, which often incorporated elements of photorealism within a pared-down scene. Examples of his work are Pottery and Still Life Ingredients.

Early life

Patrick Joseph Caulfield was born on 29 January 1936 at 17 All Saints Road, Acton, west London. During the second world war Caulfield's family returned to Bolton in 1945, where his parents were born, to work at the De Havilland factory. Leaving Acton Secondary Modern at the age of 15, Caulfield secured a position as a filing clerk at Crosse & Blackwell and later transferred to the design studio, working on food display and carrying out menial tasks. At 17, he joined the Royal Air Force at RAF Northwood, pre-empting requirement for national service. Inspired by the 1952 film Moulin Rouge about the artist Henri de Toulouse-Lautrec, he spent his free time attending evening classes at Harrow School of Art (now part of the University of Westminster).

Studies and work
Patrick Caulfield studied at Chelsea School of Art from 1956 to 1960, and during this time he won two prizes which funded a trip he made to Greece and Crete upon graduation. The visit to the island proved important, with Caulfield finding inspiration in the Minoan frescoes and the bright, hard colours on Crete. One of his greatest friends was the abstract painter John Hoyland, whom he first met at the Young Contemporaries exhibition in 1959.  Progressing to the Royal College of Art from 1960 to 1963, his contemporaries included David Hockney and Allen Jones. He taught at Chelsea School of Art from 1963–71. In 1964, he exhibited at the New Generation show at London's Whitechapel Gallery, which resulted in him being associated with the pop art movement. This was a label Caulfield was opposed to throughout his career, seeing himself rather as "a 'formal' artist".

From the mid-1970s he incorporated more detailed, realistic elements into his work; After Lunch (1975) is an early example. Still-life: Autumn Fashion (1978) contains a variety of styles – some objects have heavy black outlines and flat colour, but a bowl of oysters is depicted more realistically and other areas are executed with looser brushwork. Caulfield later returned to his earlier, more stripped-down style of painting.

Caulfield's paintings are figurative, often portraying a few simple objects in an interior. Typically, he used flat areas of simple colour surrounded by black outlines. Some of his works are dominated by a single hue.

In 1987, Caulfield was nominated for the Turner Prize for his show The Artist's Eye at the National Gallery in London. In 1996 he was made a CBE.

On 24 May 2004, a fire in a storage warehouse destroyed many works from the Saatchi collection, including three by Caulfield. In September 2010 Caulfield and five other British artists, Howard Hodgkin, John Walker, Ian Stephenson, John Hoyland, and R.B. Kitaj were included in an exhibition entitled The Independent Eye: Contemporary British Art From the Collection of Samuel and Gabrielle Lurie, at the Yale Center for British Art.

He died in London in 2005 and is buried in Highgate Cemetery. His work is held in the private collections of Charles Saatchi and David Bowie and the road on which he was born was renamed Caulfield Road after his death when the area was redeveloped.

Commissions
Later in his career, Caulfield worked on several commissions in addition to his painting and printmaking. In 1990 he designed a stained glass window for The Ivy restaurant, it is visible from within the restaurant and on its exterior. In 1992 he designed a 12-metre carpet for the British Council's Manchester headquarters and in 1984 and 1995 set designs for Party Game and Rhapsody (respectively) at the Royal Opera House. Caulfield painted the doors of the Great West Organ at Portsmouth Cathedral in 2001.

Selected solo exhibitions
 2020 Alex Vardaxoglou, London, UK
 2013 Tate Britain, London, UK
 2009 Patrick Caulfield: Between the Lines, Pallant House Gallery, Chichester, UK
 2009 Prints 1964–1999, Alan Cristea Gallery, London, UK
 2006 Royal Academy, London, UK (Special Summer Exhibition Show)
 2006 Tate Liverpool, Liverpool, UK
 1999 Hayward Gallery, London, UK
 1996 Claudine Papillon, Paris, France
 1992–93 Retrospective, Serpentine Gallery, London, UK
 1989 Waddington Galleries, London
 1985 Waddington Galleries, London, UK
 1982 Retrospective, Nishimura Gallery, Tokyo, Japan
 1981 Patrick Caulfield: Paintings 1963–81, Walker Art Gallery, Liverpool, UK (touring to Tate Britain, London and Waddington Galleries, London, UK)
 1978 Tate Gallery, London, UK
 1968 Robert Elkon Gallery, New York, UK
 1965 Robert Fraser Gallery, Britain, London

Selected public collections

UK
 Arts Council of Great Britain, London
 British Council, London & Manchester
 Manchester City Art Gallery, Manchester
 National Museum of Wales, Cardiff
 Scottish National Gallery of Modern Art, Edinburgh
 Tate Gallery, London
 Walker Art Gallery, Liverpool
 Whitworth Art Gallery, Manchester
 Victoria and Albert Museum, London

USA
 Dallas Museum of Art, Texas
 Harry N Abrams Collection, New York
 Virginia Museum of Fine Arts, Richmond

Australia
 National Gallery of Australia, Canberra
 Art Gallery of Western Australia, Perth

Notes

References
 
 Marco Livingstone, Patrick Caulfield: Paintings, published by Lund Humphries and Waddington Galleries, 2005 
 Caulfield, P. (1992). Patrick Caulfield, Paintings 1963–1992. London: Art & Design. 
 Caulfield and Hoyland joint interview. The Australian. 19 Feb 1980

External links
 
 Caulfield at the Tate Gallery (includes images of many of his pieces)
 Caulfield works at Cristea Roberts Gallery (ditto)
 Caulfield at Waddington Custot Galleries (ditto)
 Caulfield Exhibit in Seattle (ditto)
 Caulfield biography
 BBC News:  Pop artist Patrick Caulfield dies
 Photograph of his gravestone

1936 births
2005 deaths
20th-century English painters
English male painters
English people of Irish descent
21st-century English painters
English printmakers
Royal Academicians
Commanders of the Order of the British Empire
Alumni of the Royal College of Art
Alumni of Chelsea College of Arts
British pop artists
Burials at Highgate Cemetery
Opera designers
English contemporary artists
20th-century British printmakers
20th-century English male artists
21st-century English male artists